Kjellman may refer to:
 Cape Kjellman, a cape marking the east side of the entrance to Charcot Bay
 Kjellman machine gun, a machine gun produced in Sweden

 People
 Björn Kjellman (born 1963), Swedish actor and singer
 Frans Reinhold Kjellman (1846-1907), Swedish botanist who specialized in marine phycology
 Kristen Kjellman (born 1984), American lacrosse player